Diana Carolina Sáenz Brown (born 15 April 1989) is a Costa Rican footballer who plays as a defender for the Costa Rica women's national team. She competed at the 2015 FIFA Women's World Cup in Canada.

Honours 
Costa Rica
Winner
 Central American Games: 2013

References

External links
 
 Profile  at Fedefutbol
 

1989 births
Living people
Women's association football defenders
Costa Rican women's footballers
People from Vázquez de Coronado (canton)
Costa Rica women's international footballers
2015 FIFA Women's World Cup players
Pan American Games competitors for Costa Rica
Footballers at the 2011 Pan American Games
Footballers at the 2015 Pan American Games
South Florida Bulls women's soccer players
Costa Rican expatriate footballers
Costa Rican expatriate sportspeople in the United States
Expatriate women's soccer players in the United States